Andy Mougal is a Seychellois football player.  He is a striker on the Seychelles national football team.

References

External links

Year of birth missing (living people)
Living people
Seychellois footballers
Association football forwards
Seychelles international footballers
Place of birth missing (living people)
21st-century Seychellois people